Jangyeon Byeon clan was one of the Korean clans. Their Bon-gwan was in Changyon County, Hwanghae Province. According to the research in 2000, the number of Jangyeon Byeon clan was 1931. He was a menxia Shilang in Song dynasty. He was a great grandchild of Byeon gyeong who was from Longxi Commandery, China and served as government official after he was naturalized in the Later Silla.

See also 
 Korean clan names of foreign origin

References

External links 
 

Korean clan names of Chinese origin